Johan Nyholm (3 February 1881 – 8 April 1935) was a Finnish rower. He competed in the men's coxed four event at the 1912 Summer Olympics.

References

External links
 

1881 births
1935 deaths
Finnish male rowers
Olympic rowers of Finland
Rowers at the 1912 Summer Olympics
People from Pirkkala
Sportspeople from Pirkanmaa